Boško Peraica (born 7 December 1977) is a Bosnian football striker who retired in 2014.

References

1977 births
Living people
People from Livno
Association football forwards
Bosnia and Herzegovina footballers
NK Troglav 1918 Livno players
HNK Cibalia players
FC Admira Wacker Mödling players
AZAL PFK players
HŠK Posušje players
NK Međimurje players
HŠK Zrinjski Mostar players
NK Vinogradar players
NK Široki Brijeg players
Croatian Football League players
Austrian Football Bundesliga players
Azerbaijan Premier League players
Premier League of Bosnia and Herzegovina players
First Football League (Croatia) players
Bosnia and Herzegovina expatriate footballers
Expatriate footballers in Croatia
Bosnia and Herzegovina expatriate sportspeople in Croatia
Expatriate footballers in Austria
Bosnia and Herzegovina expatriate sportspeople in Austria
Expatriate footballers in Azerbaijan
Bosnia and Herzegovina expatriate sportspeople in Azerbaijan